Diaporthe tanakae is a plant pathogen.

References

Fungal plant pathogens and diseases
tanakae
Fungi described in 1982